Gunkel (variant Gunckel) is a surname of German origin. Notable people with the name include:

Gunkel
 Claus Killing-Günkel (born 1963), German interlinguist
 Daniel Gunkel (1980), German football midfielder
 David J. Gunkel (born 1962), American academic
 Hermann Gunkel (1862–1932), German Old Testament scholar
 Ray Gunkel (1924–1972), American professional wrestler
 Red Gunkel (1894–1954), American Major League Baseball pitcher
 Wolfgang Gunkel (born 1948), German rower

Gunckel
 Hugo Gunckel Lüer (1901–1997), Chilean pharmacist, botanist, and university professor
 Lewis B. Gunckel (1826–1903), American attorney, politician, and advocate

German-language surnames